TV 4  is a Polish free-to-air television channel. It was created through the merger of Nasza TV and Polsat 2 and started broadcasting on 1 April 2000. The station belonged to company Polskie Media. Polskie Media was a subsidiary of Polsat Group. In August 2013 Polskie Media was acquired by Polsat Group, and from 2014 Polsat Group is a direct broadcaster of TV4.

History
TV4 was established on April 1, 2000 as a result of the merger of Nasza TV (1998–2000) and Polsat 2 in its initial format (1997–2000). From the beginning of TV4's existence until 2005, the TV Odra stations started relaying TV4, thus extending the network of transmitters. Each of the local stations had guaranteed daily slots to broadcast their own programs. With time, however - for financial reasons - subsequent TV stations resigned from broadcasting them (in practice, simply becoming transmitters of the TV4 signal). Each of the TV Odra stations - apart from their own local broadcast slots for several hours a day - still carried the channel, except for NTL Radomsko which has been rebroadcasting TVN since September 2005.

TV4 mainly broadcasts movies and series as well as entertainment and cultural programs. From March 2007 to the first half of 2011, the program was broadcast around the clock. Later, TV4 started between 5.05am and 6.40am and ended between 2.00am and 4.30am. From August 2013, the station is again broadcasting 24 hours a day. On March 1, 2012, TV4 switched to the 16:9 aspect ratio with WSS signal. On June 17, 2013, TV4 ended analogue terrestrial broadcasting and from that day on, it is broadcast only digitally. On January 1, 2014, Telewizja Polsat became the owner of the station that so far was formally owned by the Polskie Media holding (which since August 30, 2013 was 100% owned by Telewizja Polsat).

On October 1, 2015, TV4 launched its HD feed along with three other channels (Polsat 2 HD, Polsat Play HD, Polsat Cafe HD).

On 30 March 2017, TV4 unveiled its last new graphics package, designed by SADAJ. The idents consists of a girl or a ballerina dancing around the screen. The logo remains unchanged.

Since September 15, 2020, the channel's signal is broadcast on the Internet on the ipla VOD website belonging to the broadcaster.

Major programmes

See also 
 TV6

References

External links
 Official Site 

Television channels in Poland
Television channels and stations established in 2000
Polsat